Tulun (also Romanized as Tūlūn) is a village in Ojarud-e Gharbi Rural District, in the Central District of Germi County, Ardabil Province, Iran. At the 2006 census, its population was 336, in 89 families.

History
Tulun is considered to be one of the historical and important villages of Moghan plain and Ardebil Province. This village, especially during the rule of Nader Shah, enjoyed a certain reputation. In the history of contemporary during the Second World War and during the occupation of Iran by the Allies in September 1942, the Soviet Red Army, when crossing the borders of Tulun, they encountered the resistance and hard defenses of the villagers of Toulon, who were commanded by Mirjalil Khaghani, and the enemy forces fled with heavy casualties.

Population
According to population and housing censuses of 1965, 1970, 175, 1985, the village has 133, 108, 106, 89 households and 815, 667, 526, 336 people respectively. In the 2006 census of the total population, 148 were male and 187 were women. In this year, 317 people aged 6 and above were 255 and more than 80% were literate, as well as 68 men and 3 employed women, and only 1 in unemployed men. According to the latest census data of 1990, the village of Toulon has 84 households with 275 inhabitants, a decrease of 61 people over the past 5 years.

Economy and jobs
The village is suitable for livestock and agriculture, and as a result most of its inhabitants engage in livestock farming and farming, and thus earn a living. Due to being mountainous and high quality rangeland, livestock has a booms than from agriculture. Horticulture and cultivation of walnut trees, apples, plums, apricots, cherries and others are limited, and the Tulun walnut product is famous for its high quality.

Shabih-Khani
Ceremony of  Sorry shabih-khani the eleventh day of Muharram, the village of Toulon, has enjoyed a special reputation among the lovers and lovers of the Majesty Imam Hussein (AS), and attracts a large group of people from all over the country every year. The ceremony is carried out by Sadat and the elders of Toulon with special enthusiasm and warmth.

:fa:تولون (اردبیل)

Neighbors
Germi
khan kandi
Loskeh Daraq
Azizlu

References 

Towns and villages in Germi County